Revolution Radio is the twelfth studio album by American rock band Green Day, released on October 7, 2016 through Reprise Records. A self-produced effort, it marked their first release since touring guitarist Jason White returned to his original role as a touring member. White subsequently did not participate in the recording sessions. It is their first album since 2009’s 21st Century Breakdown not to be produced by longtime producer Rob Cavallo. It is also their first album since 2000's Warning to not carry a parental advisory label, although the track "Youngblood" features profanity.

Three singles were released from the album; "Bang Bang", "Still Breathing", and "Revolution Radio". The album received generally positive reviews from music critics, appeared on multiple year-end lists, and sold 95,000 first-week album-equivalent units in the US to debut at number one on the Billboard 200. Revolution Radio also debuted at number one in the United Kingdom, Ireland, Italy, Canada, and New Zealand.

Background and composition
Work on what would become Revolution Radio began in 2014, following the 99 Revolutions Tour, in support of ¡Uno!, ¡Dos!, and ¡Tré! (2012).

After acknowledging that the trilogy of albums had "absolutely no direction to them" and were an attempt at being "prolific for the sake of it," lead singer and guitarist Billie Joe Armstrong claimed that the record is "not so much a makeover as a make under." The lead single, "Bang Bang," described by Armstrong is about "the culture of mass shooting that happens in America mixed with narcissistic social media."

Prior to the recording sessions, Jason White chose not to participate and he demoted himself back to being a touring member. The album's lead single, "Bang Bang", premiered on August 11, 2016. Prior to the album's release, its title track, "Revolution Radio", and "Still Breathing" were released on September 9 and September 23, respectively. On the album's release date, the official lyric video for "Youngblood" was uploaded on the band's website. On October 12, a lyric video for the song "Ordinary World" was released. On October 19, another lyric video was released, for the song "Say Goodbye". On November 7, a music video was released for "Still Breathing", the second official single from the album. On January 16, a lyric video was released for "Troubled Times". "Revolution Radio" was released as the third single on May 16, 2017. On September 8, a lyric video for the song "Too Dumb to Die" was released. The album's final track "Ordinary World" was featured in the 2016 film of the same name, which starred Armstrong. On December 13, 2018, an official music video for "Youngblood" was released with the caption "Merry Xmas 2018" on the band's YouTube channel.

Professional reviewers describe the album as punk rock, pop-punk, and alternative rock.

Critical reception

Revolution Radio received positive reviews from music critics. At Metacritic, which assigns a normalized rating out of 100 to reviews from mainstream critics, the album has an average score of 72 out of 100, which indicates "generally favorable reviews" based on 29 reviews.

Aaron Burgess at Alternative Press observed, "It's the first time in years Green Day haven't had all the answers. But as a statement on how it really feels to fight, it's the closest to the truth they've ever gotten." Gwilym Mumford of The Guardian stated "[after their last few albums] the band have decided to get back to basics: Revolution Radio is their most focused work in years. Lead single Bang Bang sets the tone, with a caustic consideration of the fame-hungry psychosis of a mass shooter."

Accolades

Commercial performance
Revolution Radio debuted at number one on the US Billboard 200 with 95,000 album-equivalent units, of which 90,000 were album sales. The album also debuted at number one in the UK, Ireland, Italy, and New Zealand. The album had first-week units of 30,880 in the UK, 29,470 of which were from album sales. The album charted at number 10 in the US in its second week with 21,000 units. The album sold 118,000 copies in the first three weeks in the US.

Track listing
All lyrics written by Billie Joe Armstrong, all music composed by Green Day, except where noted.

Personnel
Green Day
 Billie Joe Armstrong – lead vocals, guitars, piano, producer, composer
 Mike Dirnt – bass guitar, backing vocals, composer, producer
 Tré Cool – drums, percussion, composer, producer

Additional musicians
Ronnie Blake – trumpet ("Bouncing off the Wall")

Production
 Chris Dugan – engineer
 Andrew Scheps – mixer
 Eric Boulanger – mastering
Justin Hergett – mixing assistant
Bill Schneider, Andrew Hans Buscher – guitar techs
Pat Magnarella – management
Nick Spanos – cover photo
Frank Maddocks – creative direction, photography, design

Charts

Weekly charts

Year-end charts

Certifications and sales

References

2016 albums
Green Day albums
Reprise Records albums